Braganza may refer to:

 Bragança, a city in northeast Portugal sometimes called Braganza in English
 Francis Braganza (1922-2011), an Indian Jesuit priest, bishop of Baroda (Vadodara)
 House of Braganza, a Portuguese ducal and later royal House
 Duke of Braganza, a Portuguese title that has been used for example by several heirs-apparent to the Portuguese throne
 Duchy of Braganza, a fief in medieval history of Portugal
 Braganza (company), a Norwegian holding company
Braganza v BP Shipping Limited and another, a 2015 UK Supreme Court case dealing with the issue of Wednesbury unreasonableness in relation to employment law

See also
 Bragança (disambiguation)